Simon's Town, sometimes spelled Simonstown, is a town in the Western Cape, South Africa and is home to Naval Base Simon's Town, the South African Navy's largest base. It is located on the shores of False Bay, on the eastern side of the Cape Peninsula. For more than two centuries it has been a naval base and harbour (first for the British Royal Navy and now the South African Navy). The town is named after Simon van der Stel, an early governor of the Cape Colony.

Topography
The land rises steeply from near the water's edge and the town is boxed in along the shoreline by the heights above. The small harbour itself is protected from swells by a breakwater that was built with thousands of huge blocks of sandstone quarried out of the face of the mountain above.

Simon's Town is now in effect a suburb of the City of Cape Town Metropolitan Municipality. The Simon's Town railway station is the terminus of the Southern Line, a railway line that runs south of the central business district of Cape Town. In places, the railway line runs along the steep eastern shore of False Bay, and in bad weather waves and foam from some heavy swells wet the trains.

Attractions and amenities

Boulders Beach

Boulders Beach is located a few kilometres to the south of Simon's Town, in the direction of Miller's Point. Here small coves and beaches are interspersed between boulders of Cape granite. There has been a colony of African penguins at Boulders Beach since 1985. There is no record of the birds having lived here prior to that date. There are only three penguin populations on the mainland in southern Africa; the others are close to Hermanus at Stoney Point and Betty's Bay.

Martello Tower
In the last weeks of 1795 or the first weeks of 1796, the British built a round tower on a site that today falls within the Naval Base. Britain had just annexed the Dutch colony at the Cape of Good Hope and wanted to establish some defences to ward off possible Dutch or French attacks. In front of the tower, the British also constructed a battery that they did arm with cannons. The Martello tower was used as a navigational beacon for ships entering Simon's Bay and was consequently white-washed in about 1843. The tower was restored in 1972 by the Simon's Town Historical Society (in conjunction with the South African Navy), and proclaimed a provincial heritage site; today it houses a small museum.

South African Naval Museum
The South African Naval Museum is a maritime museum, which contains collections and artefacts related to the maritime history of South Africa and the South African Navy.

Simon's Town Museum
Simon's Town Museum is a community museum established in 1977 and located in The Residency, a historical building erected by Governor Joachim van Plettenberg in 1777. The museum records and preserves all aspects of the history of Simon's Town community.

Public art
In 1985, a statue of Just Nuisance, the only dog ever to be officially enlisted in the Royal Navy, was erected in a position overlooking the harbour. The Simon's Town Museum has an exhibition dedicated to his story.

Notable inhabitants
Georgia Papageorge, installation artist
Hendrik Vermeulen, couturier
Simon Peyton Jones, computer scientist born in (and named after) Simonstown

Economy
Simon's Town became a free port in 1832.

Coat of arms
The Simon's Town municipal council assumed a coat of arms, designed by Adelbert Bonn, in September 1905. It was granted by the College of Arms on 27 September 1957.

The design is described as Quarterly: I and IV, per pale, the dexter Argent, three towers placed 2 and 1 Gules, the sinister per fess Or and Azure, in chief on a mount Vert a peacock in his pride proper and in base three plates placed 2 and 1 Argent; II and III, Azure, an estoile and in chief three crescents Argent; over all an oval cartouche with scrolled edges Or, charged with a demi-lion rampant Gules, issuant from three barrulets wavy Vert. In layman's terms, the shield is divided into four quarters. The first quarter is divided vertically, one half depicting three red towers on a silver background, the other a peacock on a gold background above three silver discs on a red background; the second quarter is blue, with three silver crescents at the top and a wavy star below on a blue background;  the third quarter is the same as the second and the fourth the same as the first; in the centre is an oval with a decorative edge displaying a red lion emerging from wavy green stripes on a golden background.

These were a slightly modified version of the arms of Willem Adriaan van der Stel, which Bonn mistakenly thought were those of his father Simon van der Stel.

The crest was the figure of Britannia resting on a golden naval crown. Two golden anchors were placed behind the shield. The motto was Fac et spera.

When the municipality was dissolved in 1996, the council placed its regalia, including the letters patent from the College of Arms, in the custody of the Simon's Town Historical Society. The society registered the arms in its own name at the Bureau of Heraldry in October 1999.

Gallery

See also

References

External links

 Simon's Town Historical Society

Maritime history of South Africa
Ports and harbours of South Africa
Suburbs of Cape Town
Populated places established in 1680
Articles containing video clips
1680 establishments in the Dutch Empire
Populated places established by the Dutch East India Company